Aliabad (also Romanized as ‘Alīābād) is a village in Larim Rural District, Gil Khuran District, Juybar County, Mazandaran Province, Iran. At the 2006 census, its population was 286, in 72 families.

References 

Populated places in Juybar County